The Chilean frigate Almirante Lynch (PFG-07) is a , the third ship of the Chilean Navy to bear the name.

Her keel was laid down in December 1971, and she was launched on 6 December 1972, completed and delivered to the Chilean Navy on 25 May 1974.

She set sail for Chile after completing a period of training with the Royal Navy, arriving in Valparaíso on 14 February 1975. In active reserve from 14 December 2006, she was decommissioned on 4 July 2007.

In March 2008, Almirante Lynch and sister ship  were sold to Ecuador. The former Almirante Lynch is in active service under the name 'BAE Morán Valverde''.

Notes 

Condell-class frigates
Ships built on the River Clyde
1972 ships
Frigates of the Cold War